Linda Kaye Scott (née Davis; born November 26, 1962) is an American country music singer. Before beginning a career as a solo artist, she had three minor country singles in the charts as one half of the duo Skip & Linda. In her solo career, Davis has recorded five studio albums for major record labels and more than 15 singles. Her highest chart entry is "Does He Love You", her 1993 duet with Reba McEntire, which reached number one on the Billboard country charts and won both singers the Grammy for Best Country Vocal Collaboration. Her highest solo chart position is "Some Things Are Meant to Be" at No. 13 in 1996. Davis is the wife of the country singer Lang Scott and the mother of Hillary Scott of Lady A.

Davis won the Grammy Award for Best Contemporary Christian Album and Best Contemporary Christian Music Performance/Song as part of the Scott Family's album Love Remains. Linda Davis now has three Grammy wins in her career.

Linda won the Billboard Music Award, as part of Hillary Scott & The Scott Family, for Top Christian Song ("Thy Will") in May, 2017.

Biography
Linda Kaye Davis was born November 26, 1962, in Dodson, Texas. She first sang in public on a local radio show at age six. By the time she was 20, Davis had moved to Nashville, Tennessee, where she paired up with the singer Skip Eaton to form the duo Skip & Linda. They signed to MDJ Records and had three minor singles on the Billboard country charts. Davis later performed at a piano bar inside a Sheraton hotel, when she was discovered by the record producer Bob Montgomery.

Davis moved to Tennessee and became a receptionist for a small studio.  She occasionally sang demos and jingles. Shortly after starting her job she met a songwriter who became her husband: Lang Scott.  After marrying in August 1984,  they had two daughters: Their daughters are Hillary Scott (April 1, 1986) and Rylee Jean Scott (2000).

Career

In a Different Light and Linda Davis
Davis's first solo chart entry came in 1988 on Epic Records, although it was not until 1991 that she released her first album In a Different Light on Liberty Records. This album produced two chart singles, but no Top 40 hits. That same year, Davis co-wrote the title track of Dawn Sears's debut album What a Woman Wants to Hear. A year later, Davis released her second album, Linda Davis, which did not produce any chart singles at all. Reba McEntire then chose Davis as a backing vocalist for her road band.

"Does He Love You" and Shoot for the Moon
Davis had her biggest chart success in 1993 when she and McEntire recorded their duet "Does He Love You". Davis's only number one country hit, it also won her and McEntire a Grammy Award for Best Country Vocal Collaboration that year. Soon afterward, Davis signed to Arista Nashville and recorded her third album, Shoot for the Moon. This album's first single, the Mac McAnally composition "Company Time", failed to enter the Top 40. It was followed by "Love Didn't Do It" at No. 58. Davis, along with Trisha Yearwood and Martina McBride, sang guest vocals on McEntire's mid-1995 cover version of the Patti LaBelle/Michael McDonald song "On My Own", although only McEntire received chart credit for it.

Some Things Are Meant to Be
Davis did not enter Top 40 on the country charts again until 1996 with the title track of her 1996 album Some Things Are Meant to Be, her second album for Arista. This song peaked at No. 13 on the country charts, becoming her highest solo chart position. Following it were "A Love Story in the Making" (co-written by the former NRBQ member Al Anderson) at No. 33, and "Walk Away", which failed to chart. Also included on this album was the song "What Do I Know", released by Ricochet the same year as its first single.

I'm Yours
Davis's fifth album, I'm Yours, was released in 1998 on DreamWorks Records, then a newly established record label. Its first single, "I Wanna Remember This", was used on the soundtrack to the film Black Dog. The song peaked at No. 20 in 1998, followed by the title track at No. 38 and "From the Inside Out" at No. 60. After this latter song, Davis left DreamWorks. She was signed to Kenny Rogers' Dreamcatcher Records in 2000.

2003–present
In 2003, Davis self-released a Christmas album with her husband, Lang Scott, and their daughter, Hillary (b. April 1, 1986). Two more self-released albums, I Have Arrived and Young at Heart, followed in 2004 and 2007, respectively. Hillary founded the country music group Lady A in 2006, who were known as Lady Antebellum up until 2020.

In 2009, Davis was inducted into the Texas Country Music Hall of Fame.

Davis joined Lulu Roman (of Hee Haw fame) for a cover version of Anne Murray's "You Needed Me" on Roman's 2013 album At Last.

In 2013 & 2015, Davis toured with the late country singer Kenny Rogers. Davis also accompanied Rogers on his "The Gambler's Last Deal" retirement tour in 2017.

Discography

Albums

Singles

As Skip & Linda

Solo

As Hillary Scott & the Scott Family

Guest singles

Music videos

Awards and nominations

References

External links

1962 births
Living people
American women country singers
American country singer-songwriters
Grammy Award winners
Singer-songwriters from Texas
Arista Nashville artists
DreamWorks Records artists
EMI Records artists
Liberty Records artists
People from Panola County, Texas
Country musicians from Texas
21st-century American women